Glen Dale may refer to

Glen Dale, West Virginia
 Glen Dale, English guitarist (The Fortunes), stage name of Richard Garforth (1943).

See also

 Glendale (disambiguation)
 Glenndale (disambiguation)
 Glenn Dale (disambiguation)